Gordon Becker (born 14 March 1936) is an Australian cricketer. He played fifty-two first-class matches for Western Australia between 1963/64 and 1968/69.

See also
 List of Western Australia first-class cricketers

References

External links
 

1936 births
Living people
Australian cricketers
Western Australia cricketers